Osella is an Italian racing car manufacturer and former Formula One team.

Osella may also refer to:
Golden Osella (Osella d'Oro), the name of several awards given at the Venice Film Festival

People with the surname
Diego Osella (disambiguation)
Enzo Osella (born 1939), the founder and chairman of Italian automanufacturer Osella
Raúl Osella (born 1984), Argentinian football player